Logie Hill  is a small village, located on a crossroads, 3 miles south of Tain, in Eastern Ross-shire, Scottish Highlands and is in the Scottish council area of Highland.

References

External links

Populated places in Ross and Cromarty